Udvarhelyszék (formerly called Telegdiszék) was one of the Székely seats in the historical Székely Land.

Situated on the western part of the Székely Land, it was the main seat (sedes capitalis) for a significant period, being the home of the Count of the Székelys and the Székely National Assembly; it also fulfilled the main administrative and judiciary functions.

It administered two sub-seats (Hungarian: fiúszék, Latin: sedes filialis): Bardócszék and Keresztúrszék.

Population
The religious make-up of Udvarhelyszék in 1867 was the following:
Calvinist: 35,759
Roman Catholic: 34,282
Unitarian: 22,263
Greek Catholic: 2,054
Greek Orthodox: 1,847
Jewish: 115
Lutheran: 113
Foreigner: 496
Total: 96,929

Gallery

References
 Orbán, Balázs (1868). A Székelyföld leírása. Pest: Panda és Frohna Könyvnyomdája.

States and territories established in the 12th century
States and territories disestablished in 1876
1876 disestablishments in Hungary